Neues vom Hexer (lit. "News from the Sorcerer"), aka Again the Ringer, is a 1965 West German black-and-white crime film directed by Alfred Vohrer and starring Heinz Drache. It is part of a series of German screen adaptations of Edgar Wallace's thriller novels, and the direct sequel of the 1964 film Der Hexer. It was also known as The Ringer Returns.

Cast
 Heinz Drache as Inspector James W. Wesby
 Barbara Rütting as Margie Fielding
 Brigitte Horney as Lady Aston
 Margot Trooger as Cora Ann Milton
 Siegfried Schürenberg as Sir John
 Klaus Kinski as Edwards
 Robert Hoffmann as Archie Moore
 Karl John as Dr. Mills (as Carl John)
 Hubert von Meyerinck as Judge Matthews
 Heinz Spitzner as Bailey
 Kurt Waitzmann as Lanny
 Lia Eibenschütz as Lady Curtain
 Teddy Naumann as Charles
 Gisela Hahn as Susan Copperfield
 Lu Saeuberlich as governess (as Lu Säuberlich)
 Eddi Arent as Archibald Finch
 René Deltgen as Arthur Milton

Production
This film is based on the thriller Again the Ringer (The Ringer Returns) by Edgar Wallace. Cinematography took place from 15 March to 27 April 1965 at Berlin/West, London and its environments.

Release
The FSK gave the film a rating of 16 and up and found it not appropriate for screenings on public holidays.

References

External links

 Neues vom Hexer at filmportal.de/en

1965 films
1960s mystery films
1960s crime thriller films
German mystery films
German crime thriller films
German sequel films
West German films
1960s German-language films
German black-and-white films
Films directed by Alfred Vohrer
Films based on British novels
Films based on works by Edgar Wallace
Films produced by Horst Wendlandt
Films set in England
Constantin Film films
1960s German films